Lutfi (also spelled Lotfi, Lutvi or Luthfi), meaning "kind" or "gracious", may refer to:

Given name

Lotfi
 Lotfi A. Zadeh (1921–2017), Azerbaijani electrical engineer
 Lotfi Akalay (born 1943), Moroccan writer
 Lotfi Nezzar, Algerian businessman

Lutfi, Lütfi
 Ahmed Lutfi el-Sayed (1872–1963), Egyptian intellectual
 Ali Lutfi Mahmud (1935–2018), Egyptian politician
 Lutfi (court official), Ottoman court official
 Lutfi Haziri (born 1969), Kosovar politician
 Lutfi Lepaja (born 1945), Albanian writer
 Lütfi Pasha (died 1564), Ottoman statesman
 Lütfi Akadlı (1902–1988), Turkish judge
 Lütfi Arıboğan (born 1961), Turkish basketball player
 Lütfi Elvan (born 1962), Turkish mining engineer, politician and government minister
 Lutfi Kabirova, Tajikistani opera singer
 Metin Lütfi Baydar (born 1960), Turkish medical scientist
 Mohammed Lutfi Farhat (born 1945), Libyan politician
 Mustafa Lutfi al-Manfaluti, Egyptian writer
 Ömer Lütfi Akad (1916–2011), Turkish film director

Luthfi
 Muhammad Luthfi bin Yahya, Indonesian Shaikh

Surname
 Abdolali Lotfi (1880–1956), Iranian judge and politician
 Amer Husni Lutfi, Syrian politician
 Huda Lutfi, Egyptian artist and historian
 Ibtisam Lutfi, Saudi Arabian singer
 João Lutfi, known professionally as Sérgio Ricardo (1932–2020), Brazilian film director
 Mohammad-Reza Lotfi (1947–2014), Persian classical musician
 Muhammad Lutfi, Minister of Trade in the Second United Indonesia Cabinet, 2014
 Nadia Lutfi (1938–2020), Egyptian actress
 Saeid Lotfi (footballer, born 1981), Iranian footballer
 Saeid Lotfi (footballer, born 1992), Iranian footballer
 Sam Lutfi, former manager of Britney Spears
 Tariq Lutfi (born 1951), Pakistani footballer

Places 
 Lutfi, Iran
 Lotfabad

See also 

 Lutfullah, Latif and Latifa, names with a similar origin